Penrod and Sam is a 1923 American silent comedy-drama film directed by William Beaudine and starring Ben Alexander, Joe Butterworth, and Buddy Messinger. Wendy L. Marshall stated that "Beaudine had the Midas touch when it came to directing children" in films like this and Boy of Mine. In 1931, Beaudine directed a sound adaptation of the novel.

Cast
Ben Alexander as Penrod Schofield
Joe Butterworth as Sam Williams
Buddy Messinger as Rodney Bitts
Newton Hall as Georgie Bassett
Gertrude Messinger as Marjorie Jones
Joe McGray as Herman
Eugene Jackson as Verman
Rockliffe Fellowes as Mr. Schofield
Gladys Brockwell as Mrs. Schofield
Mary Philbin as Margaret Schofield

Preservation status
Prints exist in the Library of Congress collection and EYE Film Institute Netherlands.

References

External links
 
 

1923 films
1923 comedy-drama films
American silent feature films
American black-and-white films
Films directed by William Beaudine
Films based on works by Booth Tarkington
Films based on American novels
1920s American films
Silent American comedy-drama films